The 2020 Hawaii Rainbow Warriors football team represented the University of Hawaiʻi at Mānoa in the 2020 NCAA Division I FBS football season. The Rainbow Warriors played their final home games at Aloha Stadium in Honolulu as members of the Mountain West Conference. They were led by first-year head coach Todd Graham.

On August 10, 2020, the Mountain West Conference suspended all fall sports competitions due to the COVID-19 pandemic. This decision was later reversed on September 24, with all 12 teams playing an eight-game, conference-only schedule starting on October 24.

The Rainbow Warriors ended their season with a winning record for the third year in a row, also claiming the New Mexico Bowl over Houston. Graham also became the first Hawaii coach since Bob Wagner in 1987 to win his debut; the last five had lost their debuts, all by 20 points or more.

Previous season
The Rainbow Warriors had their most successful season since 2010. They finished 10–5, 5–3 to finish tied for first in the West Division, claiming the division championship with a 14–11 win over San Diego State. They advanced to the Mountain West Championship, where they lost to Boise State, but won the Hawaii Bowl over archrival BYU, 38–34. This was Hawaii's first ten-win season since 2010, and just the seventh in program history. Nick Rolovich was also named Mountain West Coach of the Year, the fourth UH coach to receive that honor.

However, Rolovich abruptly resigned on January 13, 2020 to accept the head coaching position at Washington State.
Seven more assistants followed, including assistant head coach Mark Banker, offensive coordinator Brian Smith and quarterbacks coach Craig Stutzmann.

After a week, Athletic Director David Matlin hired former Arizona State head coach Todd Graham as Rolovich's successor on January 21, 2020. He was officially introduced on January 22, 2020.

Preseason

Award watch lists
Listed in the order that they were released

Mountain West media days
The Mountain West media days was initially set to be virtually held on the days of July 27–29, but were later postponed by the conference.

Media poll
The preseason poll was released on July 21, 2020. Hawaii was initially picked to finish third in the West Division. The divisions were later suspended for the 2020 season.

Preseason All-Mountain West Team
The Rainbow Warriors only had one player selected to the preseason All–Mountain West Team.

Offense 
Ilm Manning – OL

Schedule
Hawaii had its first four games against Arizona, UCLA, Fordham and Oregon canceled before the start of the 2020 season. Each cancellation, related to the COVID-19 pandemic, was due to individual conferences attempting to reduce spread of the virus through travel restrictions. Robert Morris later replaced Fordham on the schedule, announced on July 13, 2020.

The entire season was suspended by the Mountain West Conference on August 10, 2020, in response to the COVID-19 pandemic. However, the decision was reversed on September 24, with the conference announcing each team would play an eight-game, conference-only schedule. The new schedule was released by the Mountain West on October 1, 2020. Hawaii played seven of their original conference opponents, with the only change being Wyoming replacing Air Force on the schedule. Hawaii Athletics also announced that home games would be held without fans, in accordance with government regulations.

The game scheduled for December 5 with San Jose State was moved to Aloha Stadium after new COVID-19 restrictions were released in Santa Clara County, where CEFCU Stadium is located. Hawaii played as the designated road team in their new all-white road uniforms, which debuted against Fresno State.

Roster

Depth chart

Game summaries

at Fresno State

at Wyoming

New Mexico

at San Diego State

Boise State

Nevada

at San Jose State

UNLV

Houston – New Mexico Bowl

Source:

References

Hawaii
Hawaii Rainbow Warriors football seasons
New Mexico Bowl champion seasons
Hawaii Rainbow Warriors football